Lahti Town Hall was designed in 1911 by Finnish architect Eliel Saarinen. The building was completed in 1912.

Material used for building, dark bricks, were brought from Sweden.

References 

Lahti
Buildings designed by Eliel Saarinen
City and town halls in Finland
Buildings and structures in Päijät-Häme
Art Nouveau architecture in Finland
Art Nouveau government buildings